Helicophanta ibaraoensis is a species of air-breathing land snail, a terrestrial pulmonate gastropod mollusk in the family Acavidae. The species occurs in Madagascar.

References

Acavidae
Gastropods described in 1879